"Nagisa no Subete"/"Boys of Eternity" (なぎさのすべて／ボーイズ・オフ・エタニティ) is the seventh single by Kiyotaka Sugiyama, released by VAP on July 6, 1988. The double A-sides charted at No. 3 on the Oricon charts, while it appeared on The Best Ten and rising to No. 7. It would be the last single to place within the top 10 for both The Best Ten and The Top Ten for Sugiyama, as well as the last song to be released in the Shōwa period.

"Nagisa no Subete" was used for Dydo Drinco commercials for their Supoene products while its double A-side, "Boys of Eternity," was used as the theme song for Shōnan Bakusōzoku 4: Harikēn Raidāzu.

Track listing

Charts

Weekly charts

Year-end charts

References 

J-pop songs